Oleg Vitalyevich Timofeyev (Oleg Vital'evič Timofeev;  born January 12, 1963, in Moscow), is an American musicologist, specializing in lute and Russian guitar. He is best known for his pioneering work in the discovery, promotion, interpretation, and authentic performance of the repertoire for the 19th- and 20th-century Russian seven-string guitar.

Biography

Studies
Timofeyev comes from a musical family, being the son of cellist Natalia Timofeyeva. He began his study of the classical guitar in the early 1980s under the tutelage of Kamill Frauchi, about whom he later produced a documentary film, Frautschi . He holds an M.A. in Early Music Performance from the University of Southern California (1993), and a Ph.D. in Performance Practice from Duke University (1999) . Since 1983 he has been performing early music on authentic instruments of the plucked family (lute, guitar). In 1989 his musical interests brought him to the U.S., where he studied with Patrick O'Brien, James Tyler, and Hopkinson Smith.

Professional work

Revival of the Russian seven-string guitar
Since earning his doctorate he has worked for the revival of Russian music played with authentic technique on the seven-string guitar, often in collaboration with other artists, including the Russian Roma guitarist Sasha Kolpakov, the Kolpakov Trio (Timofeyev, Kolpakov Trio and Talisman 2005), and the American guitarist John Schneiderman (Timofeyev and Schneiderman 2006). Among the fruits of his research has been his rediscovery and recording the music of Matvej Pavlov-Azancheev (1888–1963), who was among the rare composers for the seven-string guitar in the first half of the twentieth century.

Timofeyev has performed and taught widely in Europe and the United States. A recipient of numerous scholarly awards, including IREX and Fulbright fellowships, he has taught and lectured at  Maimonides State Academy (Moscow), Duke University, the University of Kansas, Northwestern University, Princeton University, the University of Iowa,  Grinnell College, and the Smithsonian.

Bibliography

Scholarly publications

Film- and discography

External links
Олег Витальевич Тимофеев  - Biography in Russian in the Illustrated Biographical Encyclopedic Dictionary: Guitarists and Composers by V. V. and S. V. Tavrovskij (В.В. и С.В Тавровские, ред., Иллюстрированный биографический энциклопедический словарь: Гитаристы и композиторы)
www.russian-guitar.com - Timofeyev's personal website
International Academy for Russian Musica, Arts, and Culture - Foundation for the promotion of the Russian seven-string guitar, its music, and tradition
Iowa Roots: Oleg Timofeyev, Russian Jewish Guitarist - Interview with audio files and text by the Iowa Arts Council
Mel Bay Artist's Profile: Oleg Timofeyev
Talisman Ensemble

1963 births
Living people
American classical guitarists
American male guitarists
Russian classical guitarists
Russian male guitarists
American lutenists
Russian lutenists
Seven-string guitarists
Viol players
Torbanists
American performers of early music
Contemporary classical music performers
Musicians from Moscow
People from Iowa
American documentary filmmakers
American ethnomusicologists
Jewish American musicians
Klezmer musicians
American musicologists
USC Thornton School of Music alumni
Duke University alumni
20th-century American guitarists
20th-century American male musicians